Matías Francisco Meneses Letelier (born 28 March 1999) is a Chilean football player who plays as forward for O'Higgins in Chilean Primera División.

References

External links
 

1999 births
Living people
Chilean footballers
Chile youth international footballers
Chilean Primera División players
O'Higgins F.C. footballers
Association football forwards